Sergei Vladimirovich Lukyanov (27 September 1910 — 1 March 1965) was a Soviet film and theater actor. He was a People's Artist of the RSFSR (1952) and the winner of two Stalin Prize of the second degree (1951, 1952).

Biography 
Sergei Lukyanov was born on 14 (27) September 1910 in the village of Nizhnee (now Donetsk Oblast), in a miner's family. He went to school, then graduated from the Mining College and began working at the mine. He engaged in the circle of theatrical performances. In 1929, after one of the performances, Lukyanov offered to try his hand on the professional stage and he was invited to the Donbas Theater.

In the movie since 1945.

Family 
 First wife —  Nadezhda Tyshkevich
 Daughter —  Tatyana Lukyanova, theater actress
 Granddaughter —  Darya Poverennova
Second wife —  Klara Luchko
 Daughter — Oksana

Filmography
1944: Outright as investigator Lartsev
1945: Duel as Secret Service Col. Lartsev
1948: Boy from the Outskirts as Andrey's father
1950: Cossacks of the Kuban as Cossack Gordei Gordeyich Voron
1951: The Unforgettable Year 1919 as General Rodzyanko
1953: The Return of Vasili Bortnikov as Vasili Bortnikov
1953: Yegor Bulychov and Others as Egor Bulychov
1953: Hostile Whirlwinds as Nikanor
1953: The Miners of Donetsk as Alexey Fedorovich Kravtsov
1954: A Big Family as Matvei Zhurbin
1955: Twelfth Night as Antonio
1956: The Rumyantsev Case as Sergei Afanasyev, police colonel
1958: Oleko Dundich as Skuro
1958: The Captain's Daughter as Yemelyan Pugachyov
1959: Foma Gordeev as Ignat Gordeyev
1961: Chronicle of Flaming Years as Vasiliy Ryasnyy uchitel
1964: Attack and Retreat as commander of the guerrilla unit

References

External links

  Sergei Lukyanov on KinoPoisk

1910 births
1965 deaths
People from Yekaterinoslav Governorate
Soviet male film actors
Soviet male stage actors
Cannes Film Festival Award for Best Actor winners
People's Artists of the RSFSR
Honored Artists of the RSFSR
Stalin Prize winners
Burials at Novodevichy Cemetery